Eugene James Carroll, Jr. (December 2, 1923 Miami, Arizona – February 19, 2003) was a rear admiral in the United States Navy, and deputy director of the Center for Defense Information. After his retirement, he became a vocal proponent of nuclear disarmament.

Life
He joined the Navy in 1945. He served in the Korean War as a naval aviator and in the Vietnam War. He retired in 1980.

Afterward, he joined the Center for Defense Information. He became a knowledgeable source for nuclear disarmament. He is interviewed/featured extensively in the 1992 Academy Award winning documentary The Panama Deception discussing the U.S. position and tactics during the Invasion of Panama the week prior to Christmas 1989.

He graduated from George Washington University with an MA in international relations.

Carroll died of a heart attack at Walter Reed Army Medical Center at the age of 79. He was survived by his wife Margaret and their son. He is buried at Arlington National Cemetery, Section 66, Site 7547.

Works

References

External links
 
 https://web.archive.org/web/20120430232429/http://www.wagingpeace.org/articles/2003/02/20_krieger_admiral-carroll.htm
 http://www.harvardsquarelibrary.org/cfs2/eugene_carroll.php 
 http://www.pogo.org/about/cdi-joins-pogo.html

1923 births
2003 deaths
United States Navy personnel of the Korean War
United States Navy personnel of the Vietnam War
American Korean War pilots
United States Navy rear admirals
American anti–nuclear weapons activists
George Washington University alumni
People from Miami, Arizona
Burials at Arlington National Cemetery